The Kelurak inscription is an inscription dated 704 Saka (782 CE), written in Sanskrit with Pranagari script, discovered near Lumbung temple in Kelurak village, Central Java, Indonesia. Lumbung temple is a bit north of Prambanan temple in Yogyakarta.  

The writings on the inscription were discovered in poor condition with several parts being unclear and unreadable, as a result historians could only translate the main information of the inscription.

Contents
The inscription mentioned the construction of a sacred buddhist building to house the Manjusri statue that contains the wisdom of Buddha, Dharma, and Sangha; the same trinity as Brahma, Vishnu and Maheshvara. The construction of this sacred building was ordered by King Indra, revered in his official name Sri Sanggramadhananjaya. The reference to Hindu gods in this Buddhist temple signify the Tantrayana—Vajrayana buddhism influence. The temple dedicated to Manjusri is identified as Sewu temple, located not far north from Prambanan temple.

Today the inscription is displayed in National Museum of Indonesia, Jakarta, under the inventory number No. D.44.

See also
Canggal inscription (732)
Kalasan inscription (778)
Karangtengah inscription (824)
Manjusrigrha inscription (792)
Laguna Copperplate Inscription (900)
Shivagrha inscription (856)
Tri Tepusan inscription (842)
Buddhism in Indonesia
Candi of Indonesia
Indonesian Esoteric Buddhism

References

Further reading
   being a review of - 

Sanskrit inscriptions in Indonesia
8th-century inscriptions
Shailendra dynasty
Central Java
782
National Museum of Indonesia
Mañjuśrī